Chain stitch is a sewing and embroidery technique in which a series of looped stitches form a chain-like pattern. Chain stitch is an ancient craft – examples of surviving Chinese chain stitch embroidery worked in silk thread have been dated to the Warring States period (5th – 3rd century BC). Handmade chain stitch embroidery does not require that the needle pass through more than one layer of fabric. For this reason the stitch is an effective surface embellishment near seams on finished fabric. Because chain stitches can form flowing, curved lines, they are used in many surface embroidery styles that mimic "drawing" in thread.

Chain stitches are also used in making tambour lace, needlelace, macramé and crochet.

In Azerbaijan, in the Sheki region, this ancient type of needlework is called tekeldus.

History

The earliest archaeological evidence of chain stitch embroidery dates from 1100 BC in China. Excavated from royal tombs, the embroidery was made using threads of silk. Chain stitch embroidery has also been found dating to the Warring States period. Chain stitch designs spread to Iran through the Silk Road.

Applications

Hand embroidery
Chain stitch and its variations are fundamental to embroidery traditions of many cultures, including Kashmiri numdahs, Iranian Resht work, Central Asian suzani, Hungarian Kalotaszeg "written embroidery", Jacobean embroidery, and crewelwork.

Machine sewing and embroidery
Chain stitch was the stitch used by early sewing machines; however, as it is easily unravelled from fabric, this was soon replaced with the more secure lockstitch. This ease of unraveling of the single-thread chain stitch, more specifically known as ISO 4915:1991 stitch 101, continues to be exploited for industrial purposes in the closure of bags for bulk products.

Machine embroidery in chain stitch, often in traditional hand-worked crewel designs, is found on curtains, bed linens, and upholstery fabrics.

Variants

Hand variants

Variations of the basic chain stitch include:
 Back-stitched chain stitch
 Braided stitching
 Cable chain stitch
 Knotted chain stitch
 Open chain stitch
 Petal chain stitch
 Rosette chain stitch
 Singalese chain stitch
 Twisted chain stitch
 Wheat-ear stitch
 Zig-zag chain stitch

Hand stitch gallery

Machine variants
 The basic chain stitch is made by first sending the needle down through the material. Then, as the needle rises upward, the friction of the thread against the fabric is sufficient to form a small loop on the underside of the material. That loop is caught by a circular needle which is beneath the work. The machine then moves the material forward projecting the loop on the underside from the previous stitch. The next drop of the needle goes through the previous loop. The circular needle then releases the first loop and picks up the new loop and the process repeats.
 The double chain stitch uses two threads. It is rarely used in today's machines except for ornamental purposes because it uses more thread than other stitches. It is found in bulk material packaging, where it is used to close large bags. As this stitch can be easily unraveled, this permits easy opening of bags sewn shut in this manner.

Machine stitch gallery

Notes

Union Special Portable Chain Stitch machine internal mechanism 2200 Portable bag closing machines

See also
 List of knots

References
 Virginia Churchill Bath, Needlework in America, Viking Press, 1979 
 S.F.A. Caulfield and B.C. Saward, The Dictionary of Needlework, 1885.
 Mrs. Archibald Christie. Samplers and Stitches, a handbook of the embroiderer's art, London 1920, 1989 facsimile: Batsford, or online at Project Gutenberg
 John Gillow and Bryan Sentance: World Textiles, Bulfinch Press/Little, Brown, 1999, 
 Reader's Digest Complete Guide to Needlework. The Reader's Digest Association, Inc., March 1992,

External links
 Kalotaszeg embroidery at MagyarMuseum.org

Embroidery stitches
Sewing stitches
Chinese inventions